Podbrdo railway station serves the settlement of Podbrdo, in the municipality of Tolmin, Slovenia.

Location
The station forms part of the Bohinj Railway between Jesenice, Slovenia, and Trieste, Italy.  It is situated at the southern portal of the Bohinj Tunnel, which is the longest railway tunnel in Slovenia and passes underneath Mount Kobla and the Julian Alps drainage divide between the Danube Valley and the Adriatic Sea.

History
At that time, it was located within the Austrian Empire, and its original operator was the Imperial Royal Austrian State Railways.

After World War I, and the annexation of Podberda to the Kingdom of Italy, the station was renamed Stazione di Piedicolle (its Italian language name).  It also became the Bohinj Railway's border crossing point between the Ferrovie dello Stato (Kingdom of Italy) and the Yugoslav Railways of the Kingdom of Yugoslavia.

Soon afterwards, the station yard was enlarged, to facilitate the exchange of locomotives on trains crossing the border.

In 1947, following the end of World War II, the entire area surrounding the station was reassigned to the Socialist Federal Republic of Yugoslavia.  The station, renamed Železniška postaja Podbrdo (its Slovenian language name), simultaneously lost its status and importance as a border crossing point.

External links 

Official site of the Slovenian railways 

This article is based upon a translation of the Italian language version as at November 2010.

Railway stations in Slovenia
Railway stations opened in 1906
1906 establishments in Austria-Hungary